Adam Powell (17 August 1912 – 7 June 1982) was an English cricketer. He played for Essex between 1932 and 1957.

References

External links

1912 births
1982 deaths
English cricketers
Essex cricketers
People from Boxted, Essex
Cambridge University cricketers
Marylebone Cricket Club cricketers
Suffolk cricketers
Minor Counties cricketers
Gentlemen cricketers
Free Foresters cricketers
English cricketers of 1919 to 1945
H. D. G. Leveson Gower's XI cricketers